Woodland Echoes is the seventh solo album by English singer-songwriter Nick Heyward. It was released on 4 August 2017 on Gladsome Hawk Records. He has described it as accidentally biographical and influenced by "love, nature, togetherness, ‘70s’ pop, America, open spaces and afternoon tea".

Singles
The first single is a double A-side with the songs 'Baby Blue Sky' and 'Mountaintop' and was released on 30 June 2017. The video for 'Baby Blue Sky' was exclusively premiered by Music-News.com on 18 July 2017.

The second single, 'Perfect Sunday Sun', was premiered by Billboard on 31 October 2017. Heyward describes the song as "my interpretation of indecision, idealism and havering – a kind of trilogy, like Krzysztof Kieślowski's Three Colours film series". "It starts off in Richmond, goes to Bedford Falls in It's A Wonderful Life, to San Francisco to Hitchcock".

'The Stars', described by Mojo magazine as a top 10 single and the best track on the album, was announced as the third single in conjunction with Record Store Day UK on 6 March 2018. It will be available on 10" vinyl with an exclusive b-side, 'Everyone & Everything'.

Critical reception

Rated at 82 in Metacritic's Best Albums of 2017, it's described as a "tonic for life" and "an aural injection of Vitamin D." The album's pastoral sound and unmistakable Englishness has garnered comparisons to Lennon and McCartney, Paul Weller and Teenage Fanclub.

Track listing

Personnel

 Nick Heyward – lead vocals, acoustic guitar, electric guitar, bass guitar, drums, keyboards, glockenspiel, wood saw, whisk
 Matt Backer – electric guitar, slide guitar
 Denis Blackham – mastering
 Anthony Clark – organ, strings, keyboards, Hammond organ, Rhodes piano
 Blair Cunningham – drums
 Claire Finley – backing vocals
 Oliver Heyward – producer, bass
 Ericson Holt – Hammond organ, piano
 Joey Marchiano – drums
 Ryan Robinson – electric guitar, slide guitar
 Ian Shaw – producer, drum/percussion programming (on "Mountaintop")
 Chris Sheldon – mixing
 Simon Taylor – saxophone (on "Who?")
 Phillip Taylor – producer, double bass, bass guitar, keyboards, drum programming
 Alisa Walker – fiddle (on "Mountaintop")

Charts

References

External links
 

2017 albums
Nick Heyward albums